The 2002 National Club Baseball Association (NCBA) World Series was played at Hobbs Field in Pueblo, CO from May 23 to May 27. The second tournament's champion was Texas A&M University.

Format
The format is similar to the NCAA College World Series in that eight teams participate in two four-team double elimination brackets with the only difference being that in the NCBA, there is only one game that decides the national championship rather than a best-of-3 like the NCAA. A major difference between the NCAA and NCBA World Series is that NCBA World Series games were only 7 innings (until 2006) while NCAA games are 9 innings.

Participants
Clemson
Colorado State
North Carolina
Ohio State
Penn State
Texas A&M
Virginia
Weber State

Results

Bracket

Game Results

Championship Game

References

2002 in baseball
Baseball in Colorado
National Club Baseball Association
NCBA World